16th FAI World Precision Flying Championship took place between July 19 - July 24, 2004 in Herning in Denmark, altogether with the 14th FAI World Rally Flying Championship (July 14-20).

There were 70 competitors from Poland (8), Czech Republic (8), South Africa (8), Denmark (8), Austria (6), France (5), Russia (4), United Kingdom (4), Sweden (4), Norway (4), Germany (3), Finland (3), Slovakia (2), Switzerland (2), Slovenia (1).

Most numerous airplane was Cessna 150 (27), then Cessna 152 (23), Cessna 172 (10). There were also two Glastar and Zlin Z-43's, single 3Xtrim, PZL Wilga 2000, Robin, Ikarus C42B, SAI KZ III, SOCATA Rallye.

Contest
On the July 19, 2004 there was an opening ceremony, on the next day an opening briefing and official practice.

On July 21 there was the first navigation competition, in which the first two places were taken by the Poles: Krzysztof Wieczorek (6 penalty points) and Marek Kachaniak (32 pts), the third by the Czech Petr Opat (33 pts).

On July 22 there was landings competition, won by Nathalie Strube (FRA, 4 pts) and Michał Bartler (POL, 4 pts), the third was Harri Vähämaa (FIN, 12 pts), all flying Cessna 152s. Krzysztof Wieczorek remained the leader in overall classification.

On July 23 there was the last, second navigation competition, in which the first three places were taken by the Poles: Krzysztof Wieczorek (24 pts), Wacław Wieczorek (Krzysztof's brother, 35 pts) and Zbigniew Chrząszcz ex aequo with Petr Opat (CZE, 41 pts).

On July 24 there was awards giving and closing ceremony.

Results

Individual

Team 
Number of penalty points and place of three best competitors

  - 301 pts 
 Krzysztof Wieczorek - 71 pts, #1
 Wacław Wieczorek - 108 pts, #3
 Marek Kachaniak - 122 pts, #4
  - 459 pts
 Petr Opat - 93 pts, #2
 Jiří Jakeš - 178 pts, #8
 František Cihlář - 188 pts, #9
  - 820 pts
 Patrick Bats - 191 pts, #10
 Nathalie Strube - 311 pts, #18
 Joël Tremblet - 318 pts, #21
 - 1308 pts
 Hans Birkholm - 288 pts, #16
 Allan Hansen - 420 pts, #26
 Kurt Gabs - 600 pts, #36
 - 1335 pts
 - 1647 pts
 - 1929 pts
 - 2314 pts
 - 2413 pts
 - 2461 pts
 - 3524 pts
 - 6482 pts

References
Official Home Page
16th FAI World Precision Flying Championship

See also
15th FAI World Precision Flying Championship
17th FAI World Precision Flying Championship
14th FAI World Rally Flying Championship

Precision Flying 16
2004 in Denmark
Fédération Aéronautique Internationale
July 2004 events in Europe
Aviation history of Denmark